Thokozani Peter (born 20 January 1991) is a South African cricketer. He played in 28 first-class, 20 List A and 10 Twenty20 matches between 2014 and 2018.

See also
 List of Eastern Province representative cricketers

References

External links
 

1991 births
Living people
South African cricketers
Eastern Province cricketers
Western Province cricketers
Place of birth missing (living people)